Rottwerndorf is a village in the municipality of Pirna, in Saxony, Germany. It was incorporated into Pirna in 1923. The place was mentioned for the first time in 1337.
The village was characterized by quarryman and agriculture.

There is a Renaissance-era castle from the 16th century in the village.

References

Pirna
Populated places in Saxon Switzerland